Halfaya Field is an oil field, located east of Amarah, Iraq.

CNPC has started preliminary work on the second phase of Halfaya, which will bring the capacity to 200,000 bpd.

In December 2009, the China National Petroleum Corporation was awarded a 50% stake in the development of the field and France's Total S.A. along with Malaysia's Petronas were awarded a 25% stake.

See also

Amarah

References

Oil fields of Iraq